The Divine Temple Academy is a Nepalese high school located in Tulsipur, Dang Deukhuri District, Rapti Zone.

History and operations
It was established in 2007 (2064 BS). The name of the principal is Bhojraj Neupane. The school offers education up to grade 10.

See also

 Education in Nepal
 List of schools in Nepal

Secondary schools in Nepal
Buildings and structures in Dang District, Nepal
Rapti Zone

Educational institutions established in 2007
2007 establishments in Nepal